The fifty-third edition of the Caribbean Series (Serie del Caribe) was played in 2011. It was held from February 2 through February 7 with the champions teams from Dominican Republic (Toros del Este), Mexico (Yaquis de Obregón), Puerto Rico (Criollos de Caguas) and Venezuela (Caribes de Anzoátegui). The format consisted of twelve games, in a double round-robin format with each team facing each other twice. The games were played at Isidoro García Stadium in Mayagüez, Puerto Rico.

The 2011 Caribbean Series was dedicated to Hall of Famer Roberto Alomar, as part  of the annual tournament's events. In addition to having the Series dedicated to him, the organizing committee of the series announced that Alomar would be inducted into the Caribbean Series Hall of Fame, along with fellow countrymen and former big leaguers Carlos Baerga, Luis de León and Candy Maldonado. The Caribbean Baseball Hall of Fame was established in 1996 and honors stars in the Caribbean, primarily from the Caribbean Series.

Final standings

Scoreboards

Game 1, February 2

Game 2, February 2

Game 3, February 3

Game 4, February 3

Game 5, February 4

Game 6, February 4

Game 7, February 5

Game 8, February 5

Game 9, February 6

Game 10, February 6

Game 11, February 7

Game 12, February 7

Individual leaders

All-Star Team

References

Caribbean Series
Caribbean
2011 in Caribbean sport
Caribbean Series
International baseball competitions hosted by Puerto Rico
Sports in Mayagüez, Puerto Rico
Caribbean Series